Ptericoptomimus truncatus is a species of beetle in the Cerambycidae family, and the only species in the genus Ptericoptomimus. It was described by Melzer in 1935.

References

Desmiphorini
Beetles described in 1935
Monotypic beetle genera